The Galleries was a shopping complex in the town centre of Wigan, Greater Manchester owned by Wigan Council. It was divided into three sections formed from three formerly independent schemes: The Galleries Shopping Centre, Marketgate Shopping Centre and The Makinson Arcade. The eight-acre complex featured a combination of enclosed malls, walkways and open squares, and accounts for almost a quarter of the town centre's footprint.

History 
The Marketgate Shopping Centre, originally called The Wigan Centre Arcade, was built 1972 in the town centre on former commercial yards and markets. It opened in 1974 and went under radical remodelling in 1988 when the adjoining Galleries Shopping Centre was constructed. The Galleries, with then 60 retail spaces, was completed 1990 and opened in 1991. The many arcades and walks in the Galleries are named after the former local authorities which now make-up the Wigan Metropolitan Borough. The Galleries was owned by Wigan Council who sold it to the private sector in 1996 for over £90 million. Both centres, though connected, were independent of one another and were only brought into joint ownership in 2002 when Prime Commercial Properties acquired both premises. In 2006, they were sold to Propinvest Limited, who subsequently also acquired the nearby Victorian Makinson Arcade, which was built in the 1890s. In October 2015, Colony Capital purchased the whole complex as part of a portfolio transaction, and commissioned the Ellandi retail group to manage the centre.

Due to 'years of stagnation and decline' the complex was brought back under public ownership by Wigan Council in March 2018, who purchased it for £8 million, using money from its Manchester Airport dividend. This was part of the Council's The Deal program which aims to revitalise the town centre. In 2019, The Fire Within Festival was held on the top floors of the Galleries in six vacant retail spaces. The festival featured art, performances and exhibitions, and was managed by the local artists AL and AL.

Plans were drawn up in November 2021 to demolish the centre. In 2022, the centre was closed off to the public and demolition work commenced in November of the same year.

Decline 

Since the opening of the Grand Arcade shopping centre in 2007, situated less than 100 yards away, a number of retailers have relocated from The Galleries to it including Boots and River Island. The complex also had big blows in 2016 when Argos and Morrisons both announced they would be closing down their shops in the centre. In late 2016 a large portion of the Marketgate Shopping Centre was sectioned off from the public due to low unit rentals. , the majority of the 144 retail units in the complex are vacant, with only around 50 in use. Council fears of continued decline, potentially leading to closure and a mothballed site, contributed to their purchase of it in 2018. It finally closed in 2022.

Future 
In 2014 outline planning approval was granted for a £60 million redevelopment of the area into the 'Makinson Quarter' and the creation, on the site, of a new shopping mall of 26 larger retail spaces. However with the complex's purchase by the council, this proposal has been scrapped, and they instead want to retain the site but revitalise it with new leisure, food and drink facilities and residential development. A formal procurement process was launched by the Council in 2020 for a partner to undertake a £125 million redevelopment of the  complex. The redevelopment is expected to take seven years.

Gallery

References

External links

 The Galleries website
 Acuitus - The Galleries Shopping Centre Map

Shopping centres in Greater Manchester
Buildings and structures in Wigan